The dynemetre is an obsolete unit of torque in the CGS-system. It is based on the units dyne and metre, it is abbreviated either dyn·m or m·dyn.

Torque is a product of the length of a lever and the force applied to the lever. One dyne is the force required to accelerate 1 g with 1 g·cm/s2, this force equals 10−5 N, therefore 1 dyn·m = 0.00001 N·m.

References 

Units of torque
Non-SI metric units